Blue Caprice is a 2013 American independent drama film directed by Alexandre Moors, and based on  the 2002 D.C. sniper attacks. The film stars Isaiah Washington and Tequan Richmond as the perpetrators of the attacks, John Allen Muhammad and Lee Malvo, respectively, although the two are only referred to by their first names. It recounts how Lee, a lone teenager, was drawn into the shadow of John, who served as a father figure to him, and how they eventually began their killing spree.

Blue Caprice also stars Joey Lauren Adams, Tim Blake Nelson and Leo Fitzpatrick. It was written by R.F.I. Porto. It debuted at the 2013 Sundance Film Festival. The film was released in theaters on September 13, 2013.

Plot
Lee (Tequan Richmond) moves to the United States from Antigua by himself; his mother cannot move due to her job. As a lone teenager, Lee comes in contact with John (Isaiah Washington). John is living with his three children: one daughter and two sons. After spending some time together, John and Lee move to Tacoma, Washington, alongside John's girlfriend Angela (Cassandra Freeman). John starts introducing Malvo as his son.

John meets his old-time friend, Ray (Tim Blake Nelson), while going for a jog with Lee. Ray introduces Lee to guns. Lee turns out to be a natural marksman. One day, John tries to contact his children in Maryland but is unsuccessful due to a restraining order. Frustrated by this, John comes home and has an argument with Angela over a petty issue; Angela throws John and Lee out of her house. John and Lee move in with Ray, his wife (Joey Lauren Adams), and their toddler son. Lee discovers a cache of firearms in Ray's basement.

Gradually, John brainwashes an impressionable Lee into committing murders. Lee commits his first murder by shooting a neighbor (Maya Woods) point-blank in the head. John encourages Lee to commit more murders in order to pay back the favor of bringing Lee to the United States. Lee commits his next murder by shooting a pub owner (Bruce Kirkpatrick) in the back and robbing him. With the robbery money, John and Lee buy a dark blue Chevrolet Caprice Classic. John teaches Lee how to drive and modifies the car's rear, adding a small makeshift gun port to the trunk.

In October 2002, John and Lee conduct a siege of terror on the Washington, D.C. metropolitan area. Using a Bushmaster XM-15 rifle fired from the Caprice's gun port, they commit a series of random shootings in public places for two weeks, plunging the public into fear and hysteria. The Montgomery County Police Department and the Federal Bureau of Investigation start investigating the attacks. One night, the two park in a no-parking spot to sleep; law enforcement, having caught up to them, surround their car and apprehend them, ending their ten-month-long crime spree, which caused 17 deaths and 10 injuries.

Five months later, Lee is held in prison. He is visited by a lawyer (Linda Powell) who tries to question him about the motives of the random killings. Lee remains stubborn and asks, "Where is my father?" as police officers escort him back to his cell.

Cast
 Isaiah Washington as John
 Tequan Richmond as Lee
 Joey Lauren Adams as Jamie 
 Tim Blake Nelson as Ray
 Leo Fitzpatrick as Arms Dealer
 Cassandra Freeman as Angela
 Abner Expósito-Seary as John's son

Distribution and release
After premiering at Sundance, IFC's Sundance Selects acquired domestic distribution rights.

Reception

Critical response
Blue Caprice received generally positive reviews from critics. The film has a "certified fresh" score of 83% on Rotten Tomatoes based on 84 reviews, with an average score of 7.3 out of 10. The critical consensus states "Smart, sobering, and quietly chilling, Blue Caprice uses its horrible true-life story – and some solid performances – to underscore the dreadful banality of evil." The film also has a score of 76 out of 100 on Metacritic based on 25 critics, indicating "generally favourable reviews."

Box office
The film was given a limited release in North America in 36 theaters and grossed $93,995 in its entire run.

Graphic novel
In October 2013, it was announced that publisher Red Giant Entertainment would produce Public Enemies, a graphic novel based on the film, to be written by the film's screenwriter, R.F.I. Porto.

See also
 D.C. Sniper: 23 Days of Fear
 List of hood films

References

Further reading

External links
 
 
 
 

2013 films
2013 biographical drama films
2013 crime drama films
2013 independent films
2010s serial killer films
American crime drama films
American independent films
Hood films
American serial killer films
Drama films based on actual events
2010s English-language films
Films set in 2002
Films set in Washington, D.C.
Films set in Washington (state)
Films scored by Colin Stetson
Tacoma, Washington
Crime films based on actual events
African-American biographical dramas
2013 directorial debut films
2010s American films